The Batwa–Luba clashes were a series of clashes in the Democratic Republic of the Congo (DRC) between the Pygmy Batwa people, and the Luba people that began in 2013 and ended in 2018.

Background
The pygmy Batwa, regionally also called Bambuti or Bambote, are often exploited and allegedly enslaved by the Luba and other Bantu groups. While the pygmy never organized militarily to resist, starting with the First Congo War, rebel leader Laurent-Désiré Kabila, who won the war, organized the Twa into paramilitary groups to help him. His son, Joseph Kabila, who succeeded him, used these militias in the Second Congo War and against the predominantly Luba Mai-Mai Kata Katanga.

Course of the conflict

In Tanganyika Province, in the northern part of the former Katanga Province, starting in 2013, Pygmy Batwa rose up into militias, such as the "Perci" militia, and attacked Luba villages. In Nyunzu Territory, the pygmy hunter-gatherers organized into militias for the first time in known history. A Luba militia known as "Elements" attacked back, notably killing at least 30 people in the "Vumilia 1" displaced people camp in April 2015. Since the start of the conflict, hundreds have been killed and tens of thousands have been displaced from their homes. The weapons used in the conflict are often arrows, axes, and machetes, rather than guns.

In October 2015, Pygmy and Luba leaders sign a peace deal to end the conflict. In September 2016, the United Nations along with provincial authorities established local councils called "baraza" to address grievances and this appeared to reduce the violence. However, clashes intensified at the end of 2016, as the government tried to enforce a tax on caterpillars that the Batwa harvest as a major source of income to sell as a delicacy around the capital Kinshasa, while the military attempted to arrest a Twa warlord. Both of these events led to a violent backlash and a spread of the fighting. Twa militias also started to target Tutsis, another Bantu group, by slaughtering their cows. 

A ceasefire brokered by the United Nations in February 2017 failed, and the violence continued. The International Rescue Committee said more than 400 villages were destroyed between July 2016 and March 2017. In August 2017, the clashes intensified after Batwa attacked a group of Luba near Kalemie; in course of the following fighting about 50 people died, most of them Luba. Batwa fighters also attacked a MONUSCO convoy with arrows. A number of Blue Helmets were wounded, though they still opted not to return fire.

By the end of 2017, the economy in Tanganyika had mostly collapsed, while fields could no longer be harvested. As result, malnutrition spread amongst those who had fled, as well as those who stayed at their homes. However, open fighting had largely ceased by early 2018, although both sides still treated each other with mistrust.

On 5 June 2020, the National Assembly passed a bill to recognize the rights of indigenous peoples, including the Batwa.

Casualties

Deaths
More than a thousand people were killed in the first eight months of 2014 alone.

Displaced people
The number of displaced people are estimated to be 650,000 as of December 2017. Around March 2017, 543,000 had fled, up from 370,000 in December 2016, the strongest growth of the current conflicts in the Congo, which has the largest population of displaced people in Africa. Many refugees are allegedly forced by the government to leave the camps and return to their homes, where the fighting still continues.

Notes

References

External links
DRC Humanitarian Situation Report, 24 November 2016 - Democratic Republic of the Congo | ReliefWeb

2013 in the Democratic Republic of the Congo
2014 in the Democratic Republic of the Congo
2015 in the Democratic Republic of the Congo
2016 in the Democratic Republic of the Congo
2017 in the Democratic Republic of the Congo
2018 in the Democratic Republic of the Congo
Civil wars involving the states and peoples of Africa
Wars involving the Democratic Republic of the Congo
Military history of the Democratic Republic of the Congo
Conflicts in 2016
Conflicts in 2017
Conflicts in 2018
Insurgencies in Africa